Bally's Kansas City is a riverboat casino in Kansas City, Missouri. It is owned and operated by Bally's Corporation.

History
In 1996, Hilton Hotels opened the casino as the Hilton Flamingo. The casino is located near, but not on, the Missouri River. Instead, a 5-acre lake was constructed and the facility was built to float on that at a cost of $110 million.
In June 2000, Hilton sold the property to Isle of Capri Casinos for $33.5 million. The name was changed in March 2001 to Isle of Capri Kansas City. Later, in 2017, Eldorado Resorts bought Isle of Capri Casinos, including the Kansas City location.

In July 2020, Twin River Worldwide Holdings bought the property along with Lady Luck Casino Vicksburg from Eldorado for a total of $230 million, and renamed the property as Casino KC. Twin River then purchased the Bally's casino brand from Caesars Entertainment, changed its own name to Bally's Corporation, and announced plans to rebrand most of its casinos. As part of this rebranding, Casino KC became Bally's Kansas City in August 2021.  Bally's began a $40-million renovation of the property, including a new exterior and additional retail and dining space.

Facility
Bally's Kansas City has over 900 slot machines and table games in its  square feet of gaming space. Unlike competitors in the Kansas City market, Bally's does not have a hotel on site.

Restaurants include the Tradewinds Marketplace, the 1800 Noodle Bar, and the Pulse Bar.

See also
List of casinos in Missouri

References

External links

Casinos in Missouri
Riverboat casinos
Isle of Capri casinos